Atatürk Monument is a monument or memorial dedicated to Mustafa Kemal Atatürk, the founder of modern Turkey. It may refer to:

Atatürk Monument (İzmir), a monument in İzmir, Turkey
Atatürk Monument (Mersin), a monument in Mersin, Turkey
METU Atatürk Monument, Ankara

Other uses
Kemal Atatürk Memorial, Canberra, a monument in Canberra, Australia
Republic Monument, a monument in İstanbul, Turkey
Statue of Honor, a monument in Samsun, Turkey
Victory Monument (Ankara), a monument in Ankara, Turkey
Atatürk and Şerife Bacı Monument, a monument in Kastamonu, Turkey